Pachuria–Bhanga line is a broad-gauge railway of Bangladesh Railway. The line is maintained and operated by West Zone.

History
The first railway from Rajbari to Faridpur was built in 1899. Then, Bangladesh Railway closed the 34 km long Rajbari–Faridpur line on 15 March, 1998 because it was facing mismanagement and losses. Later, due to the demands of the people of Faridpur region, the authority started the new work of the line from 10 March, 2010. Rajbari–Faridpur rail connection was then experimentally reopened on 7 August 2014 with the running of an inter-city train. Later the government decided to open the existing 30 km railway line from Faridpur railway station to Bhanga railway station. The railway line was extended to Bhanga Junction. New railway line to Bhanga was launched on 26 January 2020 through Rajbari Express.

Stations
Pachuria Junction railway station
Khankhanapur railway station
Basantapur railway station
Amirabad railway station
Ambikapur railway station
Faridpur railway station
Faridpur College railway station
Bakhunda railway station
Talma railway station
Pukhuria railway station
Bhanga railway station
Bhanga Junction railway station

References

5 ft 6 in gauge railways in Bangladesh
Railway lines opened in 1899